HMS Seychelles (K592) was a  of the United Kingdom that served during World War II. She originally was ordered by the United States Navy as the Tacoma-class patrol frigate USS Pearl (PF-88) and was transferred to the Royal Navy prior to completion.

Construction and acquisition
The ship, originally designated a "patrol gunboat," PG-196, was ordered by the United States Maritime Commission under a United States Navy contract as USS Pearl. She was reclassified as a "patrol frigate," PF-88, on 15 April 1943 and laid down by the Walsh-Kaiser Company at Providence, Rhode Island, on, according to different sources, either 28 September 1943 or 30 October 1943 Intended for transfer to the United Kingdom, the ship was renamed Seychelles by the British prior to launching and was launched on either 30 October 1943 or 12 February 1944, according to different sources.

Service history
Transferred to the United Kingdom under Lend-Lease on, according to different sources, either 12 February 1944 or 27 June 1944, the ship served in the Royal Navy as HMS Seychelles (K592) on patrol and escort duty.

Disposal
The United Kingdom returned Seychelles to the U.S. Navy in June 1946. She was scrapped in 1947.

References

Notes

Bibliography
 Navsource Online: Frigate Photo Archive HMS Seychelles (K 592) ex-Pearl ex-PF-88 ex-PG-196

1943 ships
Ships built in Providence, Rhode Island
Tacoma-class frigates
Colony-class frigates
World War II frigates and destroyer escorts of the United States
World War II frigates of the United Kingdom